Dorymenia is a genus of solenogasters, a kind of shell-less, worm-like mollusk.

References

 Salvini-Plawen L v. (1978). Antarktische und subantarktische Solenogastres (eine Monographie: 1898-1974). Zoologica (Stuttgart) 128: 1-305
 Spencer, H.G., Marshall, B.A. & Willan, R.C. (2009). Checklist of New Zealand living Mollusca. pp 196–219. in: Gordon, D.P. (ed.) New Zealand inventory of biodiversity. Volume one. Kingdom Animalia: Radiata, Lophotrochozoa, Deuterostomia. Canterbury University Press, Christchurch.

External links 
 Heath, H. 1911. Reports on the scientifics results of the expeditions to the tropical Pacific, XIV. The Solenogastres. Mem. Mus. Comp. Zool. Harvard Coll., 45(1): 1-182
 Gofas, S.; Le Renard, J.; Bouchet, P. (2001). Mollusca. in: Costello, M.J. et al. (eds), European Register of Marine Species: a check-list of the marine species in Europe and a bibliography of guides to their identification. Patrimoines Naturels. 50: 180-213
 Neave, Sheffield Airey. (1939-1996). Nomenclator Zoologicus vol. 1-10 Online. 

Solenogastres
Mollusc genera